is a Japanese manga series written and illustrated by Masanori Katakura. The manga began its run in 2000 and was serialized in Monthly Shōnen Jump until 2007. The series was transferred to Jump Square website in 2007 and finished in 2011. Shueisha collected its chapters into eighteen tankōbon volumes. In North America, Viz Media licensed the series for English release in 2007. Viz stopped the series publication after the release of fourteen volumes.

Plot
Ten years prior to the story's beginning, Kurohime brought an end to a massive war fought to own and rebuild the Tower of the Gods, which once completed would allow the builder to become a god themselves. Upon completion, Kurohime destroyed the tower and entered the realm of the gods to slaughter them, as they were the ones who started the war in the first place. Through a combination of deception and brutality, the gods captured and split her into two beings, one representing her rage, and the other representing her compassion.

The being representing her rage, in a form of a small girl named 'Himeko', seeks to regain her body and powers, and attempt to take down the gods again; however, the curse can only be undone with love. Throughout the course of the manga, Kurohime is able to regain her ability to love through her relationship with Zero, causing her to evolve into different incarnations throughout the various story arcs.

Characters

Protagonists

Kurohime is the most powerful witch-gunslinger in the world; such as the ability to summon and control a wide variety of dragons. Ten years ago, she challenged the gods and failed, and was split into two beings as punishment, one representing her rage, and the other representing her compassion. The form representing her rage, appearing as a child named 'Himeko', seeks to regain her appearance and powers, which can only be done through the power of love. This becomes difficult as Kurohime has become cruel and vain, responding to feelings from most men by using them to further her own goals.
 is Kurohime's childlike form, between the ages of 8 and 10. Her ability to feel love stripped away, following her split at the gods' hands, Shirohime forced Kurohime into a more harmless form, under the condition that she can only change back when she feels love. Greedy and self-centered, Himeko also lacks the power of Kurohime and originally considers Zero to be her "lap-dog". After spending time with Zero however, Himeko slowly began to regain the ability to love and feel compassion, allowing her to randomly regain the form of Kurohime for a few brief moments and then permanently during the battle with Darkray.
 is Kurohime's second alternate form, between the ages of 13 and 15. With Shirohime slain by Dark Rei, the original curse on Kurohime was broken. Unfortunately, the trauma of losing Zero resulted in Kurohime unable to access her full powers and limiting the recovery of her proper form. Informed by Yamatohime that reviving Zero will enable her to fully regain her power and form, Kurohime received a magical Lotus, which when plucked, will cause her to briefly transform into Kurohime, at the cost of losing a memory of Zero. She also receives a sword blade called Yamato-Dachi, which once empowered with the magic of the four spirit kings, will be able to resurrect Zero. Upon reception, Yamoto-Dachi promptly fuses with Senryu, changing it into Yamato Senryu which can assume the form of either a gun or a katana. Kurohime was then launched from Yamatohime's prison inside of a giant peach which was found by an old couple, who upon finding her inside gave her the name Momohime (peach princess), a name which Kurohime finds exceedingly annoying. As Momohime's magic is slightly stronger than Himeko but still heavily inferior to that of her true form. She also is a bit more mature than Himeko, willingly repaying kindness and helping those in need, but still has quite a temper to those who irritate her.
 is Kurohime's third alternate form. After having most of her memories of Zero stripped away from her by Dark Zero, Kurohime reverts to an age between 16 and 18. In this form, the majority of Kurohime's powers have been restored, allowing her to fight her enemies without sacrificing her final two memories of Zero. Sent back in time by Kairyu to learn the truth about Zero's past, Kurohime adopted a third alias to prevent Zero from learning her identity and thereby altering the past. As Kurohime's Himekojo form is slightly more "girly" than her other incarnations (her first thought upon arriving in the past is how cute the child version of Zero must be) but is also prone to vanity, taking furious offense at Ray's comments about her being ugly. Upon learning that the Zero she fell in love with is in fact Ray, Himekojo's love for him grew even stronger, and is intend to save Ray from the darkness in the present, as she failed to do so in the past. She still refers him as "Zero", despite knowing his true name. After a brutal fight with Ray, Kurohime allows herself to be consumed by the River of Death, apparently dying in the process, but also finally succeeding in returning Ray to his human form. However, it is shown that the Kurohime's soul was absorbed by the black tree which emerges from the River of Death. Yamato-hime then sacrifices herself to imbue the tree with her remaining energy, transforming the black tree into a white tree and Kurohime is reborn. She uses the ultimate blade to kill Yashahime and is reunited with Ray. It is revealed that she has the power to create a new world and that the white tree contains most of the souls of those who died. Using the white trees power to travel into space, Kurohime embraces Ray and says that one day, even if it takes an eternity, they will find a new world and be reborn so that they can start over. Four billion years later, on an Earth-like world, Kurohime, reincarnated as a male gunslinger saves Ray's life, revealed to have been reincarnated as a young woman.
 is Kurohime's other half who was split into two persona by Sword. While Kurohime was banished back to earth, Shirohime became the Goddess of Benevolence. Unlike the other "younger" incarnations of Kurohime, Shirohime is calm and collected, even to death. She was killed by Darkray when defending her other half.

Zero is a young boy saved by Kurohime in his childhood. Over ten years, he trained and became a gunslinger. He uses four guns and is known for his incredible speed. He is very loyal to Kurohime, and although he finds her difficult to handle as a child, he is still very much in love with her. Kurohime often berates him for his naivety and open kindness, but it is also what she fell in love with. His personal morals and sense of justice stems from his past:after witnessing Kurohime's power when she saved him, he vowed only to use his guns to protect and save the innocent. In order not to kill anyone, he aims mostly to disarm his aggressors with his shots. Throughout the story, he suffers great - and almost fatal - physical damage in order to save his beloved Kurohime, despite her often insensitive and ungrateful behavior. His love for Kurohime was so strong that he willingly sacrificed his own life to save her from the River of Death.
Near the end of the time traveling arc, it is revealed that the true Zero was killed after a situation forced Zero to resurrect. His soul was destroyed by the Shinigami Angels and that in reality the Zero Kurohime knows is actually Zero's brother Ray posing as Zero in penance.
Zero's soul is taken to the underworld by Yashahime and there he is resurrected as  the new God of Death. The two later confront Kurohime at the prison of the Spirit King Byako and attack her, even though she is not willing to fight him. After taking back his signature blue scarf from Kurohime, he tears out most of the petals that comprise her soul lotus, leaving one behind. This single lotus petal contains the memories of the love Kurohime has for Zero, and the pain of losing him. This act causes Zero to remember his true memories and he transforms into his full Death God form. It is revealed that Zero holds much darkness in his heart, as the "Good Zero" is told to be just "an image created by an idealistic youth". Zero continues the fight but later retreats with Yashahime after she was severely injured by Kurohime. While Kurohime was gone into Zero's past, Dark Zero declared that he would wipe out humanity, and would ask the Supreme God, Igudo, to commence with the apocalypse.

Despite being so small, Ray is actually Zero's older twin brother, a quiet young boy that keeps to himself. After seeing his mother murdered by Doc, he loses the will to speak, as well as stopped growing, and follows Doc around looking for a chance to kill him. He will not allow anyone else to kill Doc but himself, therefore protecting him from other attempts at his life. Unlike his younger brother Zero, or his later persona of Zero, the original Ray is rude and somewhat violent, calling Kurohime a "hag" and assaulting her when he considered her annoying.

The original Zero was the younger twin brother of Ray. As this Zero did not witness their mother's death at the hands of Doc, he continued to grow and was not rendered mute. His skills at quick drawing has earned him the moniker "Quick Draw Zero". He was killed by the Vengeance Knights when Doc betrayed the group. When Ray committed suicide after being awakened as a Shinigami and then returned to human by Himekojo, Zero's spirit spoke to Himekojo, requesting her to resurrect him with the forbidden spell as an angel, and returning Ray's soul to his body. After much painful decision, Himekojo agreed, and shortly after saving Ray, Zero's soul was torn apart by Sword and her comrades.

Onimaru is a heavyset gunslinger in pursuit of Kurohime. He was once her most loyal soldier and his back bears a large tattoo of the kanji for "dog", with the kanji for "Kurohime" branded near it. Feeling betrayed by the apparently selfish witch, he swore revenge on her, and intends to take it now that she has been stripped of her magical powers. Ironically enough, he is still attracted to her.

Tsucchi is an alternate form of Onimaru. In a bid to take down Kurohime, the leader of the "Death Angel" squad, Sword, seduces Onimaru and compels him to kiss her leg, and he nearly became a hideously grotesque man-snake. However, his sheer willpower prevents the transformation from fully occurring, and he becomes a mute miniature lizard;his personality and intelligence also survive this change. After learning of Kurohime's true motivations from Shirohime, he convinces her to break the curse placed on Kurohime and afterward tags along with Himeko and Asura in their quest to Yamato. By the time for the final battle between Zero and Kurohime, Tsucchi was reverted to normal by Sword into Onimaru, and he gave Kurohime the strength to fight on by expressing his love for her.

Yuka is a beautiful girl who first ran into Barahime, a once seductive witch who has been drained of her magical powers by Kurohime. Barahime possessed Yuka and used the girl to help drain men of their life force to continue to be young and beautiful. However, this possession can only happen at night, as by day time, Yuka is in control of her own body. With the help of Zero and Kurohime, Barahime was extracted from Yuka. This possession has left Yuka with some magical powers, and she started to develop them.
After Zero's demise, Barahime, who was set ablaze in hellfire by Kurohime to burn forever, was saved by Sword. Barahime then possesses Yuka again, this time completely, and follows Kurohime into the past in attempt for revenge. However, Kurohime completely kills Barahime, saving Yuka. Since then, Yuka follows her savior.

Asura is a beautiful looking woman. The people of that land call her and her kind, demons. She is extremely powerful, possessing incredible magical powers, whose destructive properties rivals a god. She is first introduced as a mysterious character who plays a subtle hand in aiding Kurohime and Zero defeat a witch. She is next seen fighting a Mountain God and is severely wounded while protecting Zero and Kurohime. Shortly after being tended to by Zero, they are attacked again by the Mountain God, and Kurohime and Asura team up together to destroy their enemy.
She is attuned to the element of fire, and much of her magic revolves around flames. She also has a demonic form that allows her to use her powers more efficiently. However, as a demon of fire, she is vulnerable to water and cannot swim. She was initially reluctant in having anything to do with Zero and Kurohime, but after being saved by Zero and witnessing the power of a vengeful Kurohime, she has a change of heart, and tells Kurohime about her master who seems intent on helping Kurohime regain her full power.

Tokugawa Kazuma is the prince of the Big Edo City. He is a powerful swordsman, being able to strike with lightning speed. Later, he was given a necklace that has stones imbued with the power of the three out of four Spirit Kings by his father. This grants him great powers, but using it would require him to provide his life force to Yamatohime as an exchange;this led his hair to turn white and his health to deteriorate. Kurohime noted that Kazuma's personality is exactly the same to that of Zero and has seemingly fallen in love with Kurohime.
 and 
Yukionna and Yukiotoko are the goddess and god of snow, respectively. They are childhood friends, and Yukio has fallen in love with Yuki, but Yuki was determined to fill her heart with more than one man, which led her to capture many men and freeze them solid, keeping them in her vault. Despite this, Yukio is still deeply in love with her, and is willing to do anything for her. The two of them has been assigned to guard the Spirit King Byakko, but were ultimately defeated by Kurohime. During this clash, in which Yukio has taken a formed a friendship to Kurohime, Yuki was able to realize her mistake, and showed that she truly loves Yukio, and the two reconciled. The two, indebted to Kurohime, defied Yashahime and helped Kurohime, Asura, Kazuma, and Tsucchi all the way throughout the battle against the Kurohime Punishment Squad in Big Edo City, and against the Gods when Yashahime tried to devour the planet.
In combat, Yuki has command of the element of snow and ice, while Yukio can into a sleek and combat-adept abominable snowman form. Their weakness is fire, which Kurohime took advantage of. After being defeated by Kurohime, the two were reduced to their childhood forms, but can unite into one single body to become an adult during combat.

Rider was a member of the Wolf Brigade first mentioned in the first volume, with the nickname "Lightning Bolt". He fights alongside Zero when Kurohime returns to the past. He accompanies the gang when the Wolf Brigade defects to the Onimaru Gang, citing his reason as feeling he still owes Doc something. This is revealed when Zero was killed and Ray left: Rider stayed only for the twins' sake, due to Rei refusing to leave Doc's side. However, as Ray finally left, Rider then killed Doc in the hospital, and then left to find Ray, all the while becoming a wanted man for murder. Ten years later, Kandata (Doc) finds Rider and eventually brings him to Dark Zero, where the two reunite, while seemingly to have lost his left eye. His weapon is a gun hammer, similar to a Monster Hunter weapon, which makes explosions with each impact. He also is a very quick shot with a pistol.

Doc is the greedy and nefarious leader of the Wolf Brigade. He keeps Ray close by his side in order to have Zero to fight for him, and cares nothing about his men as long as he gets money. To this end, he sacrifices the wounded of the Wolf Brigade to the Lion Castle in order to launch a flank attack. After the battle ends, most of the Wolf Brigade beats him up then defects to the Onimaru Gang. He travels with the group, but it is discovered that he stole an obscene amount of money from the military, which lands the group in prison.
His desire to learn why Ray spared his life was so strong that even after death he would not settle in Hell as other sinners did, thus becoming the ferryman.

Antagonists

Darkray was the former God of Death, and one of the six High Gods. He fought Kurohime when she first challenged the gods. Using the soul of an infant murdered by an attack on Kurohime as a shield, he defeated her with Sword, slicing her in half. He was also the one who suggested splitting Kurohime into two beings:one consisting of pure hate, the other, of love and compassion. This resulted in the birth of Shirohime (White Princess), the Goddess of Mercy. He later appears in the fourth volume, not long after Kurohime killed the mountain god Moai. He orders Shirohime to seal Kurohime's powers so that he and his death angels could kill her.

Yashahime is the Mother Goddess of Earth, one of the six high gods, and lover of Darkray. She swears to kill Kurohime to avenge the fallen God of Death, and first appears when Kurohime killed Gandhara on Yamato. She is very powerful, with a beauteous appearance masking a fearsome treelike form.
During confrontations between the two, Yashahime shows not only extreme sadism, but a dual personality of sorts:being polite and calm in one moment, but revealing her cruel and true form when angered. Aside from her command over the earth and trees, Yashahime also wields the Hakushinboku (White God Tree), which is said to be a symbol of divine power, and the opposite of Kurohime's Kokushinboku (Black God Tree). Her twisted personality and extreme power makes even Darkray to fear her in the past.

Kurohime Punishment Squad

Also known as Reikahime, Sword is the leader of the  sent after Kurohime and Zero. She and her comrades (and ) are sent to reap a group of vengeful souls from a ghost wagon who were revived courtesy of Kurohime. Sword seems to have a personal vendetta against Kurohime, leading her and her fellow death angels in an attempt to kill her by turning members of the Onimaru Gang into large demonic snakes.
Sword (and former enemies of Kurohime) reappear in the second arc as part of the Kurohime Punishment Squad. She displays several new abilities, notably the ability to manipulate blood and suck her victim's veins dry of it, and a new outfit that makes her appear more human (compared to her initial appearance).

Barahime is a witch who used to steal the lives of men in order to maintain her youth. She was defeated by Kurohime before the start of the series, and subsequently lost her youth. Barahime then went on to possess Yuka, a young girl. Her possession was incomplete, only allowing her to take complete control at night, but she was able to use Yuuka's beauty to once again kill men and keep her youthful appearance. Once again defeated by Kurohime, she was separated from Yuuka, and cursed to burn. The flame was extinguished by Sword, leader of the Death Angel Squad, who invited her to join the Kurohime Punishment Squad. She once again possessed Yuuka, this time completely, and with the rest of the squad was sent back in time with Kurohime after their battle in Edo city.

Oka is another member of the Kurohime Punishment Squad. She has abilities that are similar to Kurohime's, such as summoning dragons as well as amazing skill as a sniper. In fact, her ability to fire witch bullets through sniping and retain high levels of control surpasses Kurohime's capabilities. As a child, Oka was the princess of one of the kingdoms that was destroyed by Kurohime during her attempt to increase her magic in preparation for her assault on the gods. Later, at the Tower of the Gods, Oka attempted and failed to murder Kurohime who spared Oka and gave her a sword like witch-gun, telling her that if she really wanted revenge then she should learn to use magic. Unlike the other members of the Kurohime Punishment Squad, Oka dislikes involving innocent bystanders but is willing to use any methods she deems necessary to kill Kurohime.

Aika is Saika's lover and a magic gun user of the Kurohime punishment squad, she's nearly blind from birth but can concentrate her magic to sense her surroundings. She temporarily took his "most sacred" thing in return for him cheating on her, but she loves him to the extent of risking her life for him.

Saika is a pretty boy who sought to make Kurohime his in chapter 3, but was spurned after she realized he was only interested in her power. He returns as part of the Kurohime punishment squad to get revenge since Aika, his lover found out he cheated on her and removed his "most sacred" thing. In spite of this he truly loves Aika, becoming her eyes in exchange for her love, since she will love him after his beauty fades. Siding with the Materen in an attempt to kill Kurohime, Saika was betrayed and captured by the Materen's leader who intended to use their magic to transform him into an artificial death angel who would then exterminate all humanity.

Spirit Kings
The four Spirit Kings are the only spirits who has their own free wills by each possessing a soul, while other spirits, also known as demons or devils by humans, do not. They are the life forces of the world, a power which the gods covet. Along with this, when the four spirits imbue their life forces into the Yamato Tachi sword, it can become the god-slaying sword. To these ends, the gods captured the Spirit Kings to prevent the sword's completion, as well as slowly drain them of their life forces for their lust of power. Only Seiryu, the Spirit King of the Wind, was able to elude capture. They assist Kurohime in completing the Ultimate Sword, despite their hatred for humans for polluting the world.

Yamatohime is also known as the Phoenix , Devil God, and Spirit Queen of Fire. She is Asura's master, and was imprisoned by the gods in the depths of a volcano, under constant watch by the Demon God Gandhara. After Kurohime arrives in Asura and slays Gandara, Yamatohime gives Kurohime a sword hardened by the sun; the Yamato-Dachi, and a lotus flower with seventeen (originally 19) petals, each representing a memory of Zero. A petal from the flower will fall every time Kurohime reverts to her true form. She assigns Asura with the task of guiding Himeko to the four spirit kings, whose power, when added to Yamato-Dachi, will be enough to free herself. Yamatohime says she will revive Zero if Himeko can successfully release her, then sends the group away as Tor, God of War, and Yashahime arrive in response to Gandhara's defeat. As Yamatohime is the very life of the planet, she cannot be taken into the blade, so Asura was instead created to serve as replacement. By the time the Absolute Sword was complete, Yamatohime has already been reduced to a childlike form and her body rusting, her energy greatly drained.

Genbu is the Spirit King of Water. He was captured by Saiyuki, the goddess of the ogres, and through his imprisonment grants her the abilities of turning to intangible mist and liquid, as well as crafting ice for offense and an impenetrable rock-scaled armor. Disgusted by the ways humans pollute the earth and hunt other creatures to extinction, Genbu was willing to remain imprisoned by the gods. Kurohime convinced him though that humans did have the potential for good and he willingly sacrificed himself to Yamato Senryu. By doing so, he bestowed on Kurohime the ability to summon the same armor Saiyuki wielded as well the ability to transform Yamato Senryu into Genbu Yamato Senryu, a shotgun with a barrel shaped like a Dragon.

Byakko is the Spirit King of Earth. He was captured by the snow goddess Yuki-onna (Yuki) and her lover abominable snowman Yuki-otoko (Yukio), and was encased completely behind a giant ice wall. Although willing to sacrifice himself in the name of ending the Gods' tyranny, he was hesitant to grant his powers to Kurohime, who by that time had lost almost all her memories of Zero. But after seeing that her love for Zero remained intact, Byakko transferred his power to Yamato Senryu and enabling it to transform into a Gatling gun weapon called Byakko Yamato Senryu, which can fire multiple witch bullets over a short period.

Seiryu is the Spirit King of Wind. As the wind has no solid form, he is the only one of the four Spirit Kings not to be captured by the Gods, being able to evade them. Also, as space-time also has no solid form, like the wind, Seiryu has control of that as well. He took the form of the ocean dragon, Kairyu, and assisted Kurohime against a group of fishermen hunting for mermaid flesh, and then later led her to Zero's past, as per Kandata's request. When she returned and learned of Zero and Rei's past, and were attacked by Yashahime, Seiryu revealed his true form and deemed Kurohime to be worthy of his power, as her love for Zero is still strong, and let his own soul be transferred into the Yamato Senryu, which allows it to transform into a rifle with the size of a bazooka. This weapon, when used by Oka, had to ability to send the person it shoots back in time, as Asura was sent back to the time just as Kurohime missed her with the initial shot.

Kairyu is the sea dragon, who first appeared to grant Himeko her wish to see Zero again. However, as it was a mere illusion, it didn't satisfy her at the very least. When the Kurohime Punishment Squad took over his body and used him against Kurohime, he manages to escape from their grasp in his smaller medium body and takes Kurohime back to the past, to understand Zero more. When they return to the present, Kairyu reveals his true identity, Seiryu, during the battle against Yashahime.

Publication
Kurohime is written and illustrated by Masanori Ookamigumi Katakura. The manga first appeared in Monthly Shōnen Jump Extra in 2000 and ran in Monthly Shōnen Jump from 2003 until 2007, when the magazine ceased its publication. The series was transferred to Jump Square website in 2007 and finished in 2011. Shueisha collected its chapters into eighteen tankōbon volumes, published from February 4, 2002 to April 21, 2011.

In North America, Viz Media announced the acquisition of the series in July 2007. The first volume was released on September 4, 2007. Publication of the series stopped after the release of volume 14 on November 3, 2009.

Volume list

Video game
A Japan-exclusive video game based on the series was developed and published by Tomy Corporation for the PlayStation 2 on March 30, 2006.

References

Further reading

External links
 

Romantic comedy anime and manga
Shōnen manga
Shueisha manga
Supernatural anime and manga
Tomy games
Viz Media manga